Limacella is a genus of mushroom-forming fungi in the family Amanitaceae in order Agaricales. Some of the species have been classified as members of genus Lepiota. Limacella was described by mycologist Franklin Sumner Earle in 1909.

In some older classification schemes, Limacella has alternatively been placed in family Pluteaceae. The species formerly classified in the genus Limacella are now placed in 4 genera; Catatrama, Limacellopsis, Limacella, and Zhuliangomyces.

References

Amanitaceae
Agaricales genera